Wyoming Highway 487 (WYO 487) is a  state highway in northeastern Carbon County, Wyoming and southeastern Natrona County, Wyoming that runs from its south end at US 30/US 287 to a north end at WYO 220.

Route description
Wyoming Highway 487 begins its south end at US 30/US 287 (Old Lincoln Hwy.) in Medicine Bow. WYO 487 travels another  to its north end at Wyoming Highway 220 which is located  NE of Alcova and  SE of Evansville.

History

Wyoming Highway 75 was created during the early 1970s with the inception of the Wyoming secondary state route system. Highway 75 was routed along the path of present day Wyoming Highway 487 between the two junctions of current Wyoming Highway 77 in Shirley Basin. When Wyoming 487 was rerouted over Highway 75, old WYO 487 was recommissioned as WYO 77, and WYO 75 was decommissioned. The renumbering occurred in the mid-1970s.

Major intersections

References
Official 2003 State Highway Map of Wyoming
GoogleMaps

External links

Medicine Bow, WY official website

Transportation in Carbon County, Wyoming
Transportation in Natrona County, Wyoming
487